Rozz Williams (born Roger Alan Painter; November 6, 1963 – April 1, 1998) was an American singer and songwriter known for his work with the bands Christian Death, Shadow Project (with musician Eva O), and the industrial project Premature Ejaculation. Christian Death is cited by some as a pioneer of the American gothic rock scene as well as deathrock, and is considered to be one of the most influential figures of the scene. However, Williams disliked the "goth" label and actively worked to shed it during the 1980s and 1990s by focusing on punk rock, hard rock, cabaret, and spoken word music. Williams was also involved with his groups Daucus Karota, Heltir, EXP, Bloodflag, and his own version of Christian Death (Christian Death featuring Rozz Williams), along with recording a handful of solo albums. In addition to music, Williams was also an avid painter, poet, and collage artist.

Williams committed suicide by hanging himself in his West Hollywood apartment on April 1, 1998. He was 34 years old.

Early years 
Rozz Williams was born Roger Alan Painter on November 6, 1963, in Pomona, California, and was raised in a strict Southern Baptist family. His father Robert Norman Painter was an artist. Rozz had three older siblings (Janet, Bobby, and Larry). He went to the Claremont High School.

As a child, he was a fan of David Bowie, Lou Reed, Roxy Music, T. Rex, Alice Cooper, Iggy Pop and the New York Dolls. When he reached adolescence in the late 1970s, he became attracted to the punk rock music scene. He even became friends with late Darby Crash of The Germs.

Career

Performance in bands 
By the age of 16 he began performing in bands. He took the name of Rozz Williams from a gravestone he found in a Pomona cemetery. His first bands were called The Crawlers, No, then later The Upsetters. He sang and played the guitar, although he never performed on stage. He then went on to form The Asexuals. "I thought it was funny because considering we were kind of coming out of the closet to a degree and we were, and in my mind later in life, like even last year, why can't the asexuals – and I don't mean the band; I mean in general — be in the gay parade too? Why can't they be in the back of it? Like, they are people too, and they have their preference, but it's just funny. We were just kids. We weren't that straight edge." later said Jill Emery in the interview with Nico B. In addition to being the lead vocalist, he played the organ and guitar, with Jill Emery also contributing vocals as well as playing bass, and Steve Darrow on drums. Their performances were limited to a few parties.

He then sang in a band called Daucus Karota with Mary Torcivia on percussion and Jay (John) Albert on guitar. Albert and Williams then went on to form Christian Death in October 1979 with James McGearty and George Belanger. The name "Christian Death" was a play on words of the fashion designer Christian Dior. The band broke up temporarily in 1981, and Williams formed Premature Ejaculation with performance artist Ron Athey, with whom he had been living and having romantic relationship. After only a few live performances, including one which involved Athey eating a crucified road-kill cat, clubs began refusing to book them. Williams then restarted Christian Death in the summer of 1981 with McGearty and Belanger, who also brought in guitarist Rikk Agnew who liked them after seeing them live and was later asked to join. He had previously been with The Adolescents.

Agnew, who was afraid to tour because of drugs that Rozz and Ron planned to bring with them and homophobia in southern states, and Belanger left the group in 1982. Guitarists Eva Ortiz and Johnnie Sage (Ammentorp) joined drummer Rod "China" Figueroa as replacements for live performances. By the end of the year the band had broken up once again due to drug problems.

Christian Death 

In 1983, Williams formed a new band under the Christian Death name, this time with former members of Pompeii 99, with whom Christian Death had performed at a live show the previous year. The new lineup consisted of Williams as frontman, Valor Kand on guitars, Gitane Demone on keyboards and providing backing vocals, Constance Smith on bass and David Glass on drums. Towards the end of 1983 they were invited to appear on US music TV show Media Blitz where they mimed to "Cavity" and "Romeo's Distress" and gave a short interview. Their first European show was at Les Bains Douches, Paris on February 12, 1984, and they continued touring Europe until June.

Catastrophe Ballet was recorded at Rockfield studios in Monmouth, Wales, around the same time. It was a departure from the religious overtones of their debut LP and the lyrics reflected Williams’ newfound love of surrealism and the Dada movement; the album was even dedicated to André Breton. Williams was enjoying living in France, home of many of his artistic and literary heroes – Arthur Rimbaud, Charles Baudelaire, Jean Genet, Comte de Lautréamont, Marcel Duchamp and René Magritte, among others. Valor had kicked Constance Smith out of the band following the recording of the album and, in live shows, she was replaced by Dave Roberts of Sex Gang Children.

In autumn 1984 the band returned to America and recorded Ashes, which was released the following year. Williams, Valor, Gitane and David Glass provided much of the music for the record; however, guest appearances were made by Randy Wilde on bass, Eric Westfall playing violin and accordion synth, an infant Sevan Kand crying, Bill Swain playing tuba, Richard Hurwitz on trumpet and Michael Andraes on clarinet.

The band performed shows in America to promote Ashes, climaxing with The Path of Sorrows extravaganza at Los Angeles' Roxy Theatre on April 6, 1985. This multi-media extravaganza featured films, a banquet and a program. Kristina Fuller coordinated and supervised the visuals, film sections and Williams’ four costume changes. Their performance at Hollywood Berwin Entertainment Centre a few days before was recorded and released as The Decomposition of Violets cassette. These shows saw Williams, Valor, Demone and Glass joined by Jeff Williams and Barry Galvin.

Rozz Williams officially left Christian Death after the American shows in April 1985, citing loss of interest and a distaste for touring as reasons for his departure. Valor took the rest of the band to Italy as part of the European tour.

Williams had asked Demone not to continue under the name Christian Death and Valor had agreed to change the name of the band to Sin and Sacrifice. Instead of following through with his commitment to this agreement, Valor Kand decided instead to keep the Christian Death name, first changing the name to "The Sin and Sacrifice of Christian Death", and then dropping "Sin and Sacrifice", leaving the name as "Christian Death", a decision Williams disagreed with. Williams considered Christian Death to be his creation and felt personally responsible for it as it was directly associated with his name, image, art and poetry. He felt that it was his decision, not Valor's, whether the band continued or not. Gitane Demone expressed misgivings about this, and though she did not initially leave the group (likely at least in part due to her relationship at the time with Valor) she later publicly sided with Williams on the matter.

Williams recorded for Cleopatra Records in 1992. Williams had been the only original member of Christian Death left when he departed the group in 1985, yet the remaining members continued to perform earlier Christian Death material and released several albums under the original group name.

Williams had already recorded two more songs, "Haloes" and "Spectre (Love Is Dead)", with Eric Westfall, but these were not officially released for five years. The songs appeared on the Heavens and Hells cassettes, which also included live performances Williams selected from his own tapes. A third, unfinished song from the session with Eric Westfall was called "This Mirage". This was only completed many years after, with assistance from Erik Christides, and released for the first time in 1998.

Williams released various material under different project names following his departure from the band; the first was Premature Ejaculation with Ron Athey, and then Shadow Project with Eva O, whom he married in San Francisco in 1987. The band lineup included Johann Schumann (bass) and also Barry Galvin and David Glass, both of whom also recorded with post Ashes-era Christian Death. The name "Shadow Project" was taken from the tests in Hiroshima following the nuclear bomb which left impressions or "shadows", but no bodies.

Later on, Williams reformed Shadow Project with Eva O, Jill Emery (bass), Tom Morgan (drums) and Paris Sadonis (keyboards). At the time, Rozz was increasingly falling under the influence of the philosophy of Charles Manson. Jill Emery left the band early in 1992 to concentrate her duties on Hole, who would become an internationally successful act, and Aaron Schwartz was brought in to record "Dead Babies/Killer" for the Welcome to Our Nightmare compilation CD consisting of cover versions of Alice Cooper songs. Chuck Collison also contributed samples to these tracks.

Williams, Eva, Listo (bass) and David Melford (drums) started recording new versions of Christian Death songs for The Iron Mask album in February 1992. The album was made, in part, to finance the Shadow Project European tour of February and March 1992, when they were supported by Mephisto Walz. Peter Tomlinson had replaced Tom Morgan on drums for this tour.

Williams also occasionally took part in Christian Death reunions during the late 1980s and early 1990s with Rikk Agnew, the guitarist on the band's first album.

In 1992, with the help of Eva O, Paris Sadonis, William Faith, Sevan Kand (son of Valor Kand), Scat Elis, Stevyn Grey, Kris Kohls, Brian Virtue, Wayne James, Armon Christoff and Aaron Schwartz, Rozz Williams recorded two new Christian Death studio albums entitled The Path of Sorrows and The Rage of Angels. Williams had been quoted as saying "The Path of Sorrows is probably my favorite Christian Death album".

For the last time in June 1993 at Los Angeles' Patriotic Hall, Christian Death regrouped for a one show, captured on the CD and live video Iconologia. Williams was joined by Rikk Agnew, George Belanger and Casey (bass). Following his brother's decision not to come back on stage to play the encores, Frank Agnew was credited as additional guitarist on the recordings. During some live performances, Williams could be seen wearing a T-shirt which sported the words "Never Trust a Valor".

At this time, there were effectively two bands recording and performing material under the name "Christian Death". This eventually precipitated a heated legal battle between Williams and Valor Kand which was never satisfactorily resolved.

In 1993, Shadow Project toured America. The band consisted of Williams, Eva, Paris Sadonis, Mark Barone (bass) and Christian Omar Madrigal Izzo (drums). After this American tour, Eva O and Paris left the band to work on the Eva O Halo Experience CD Demons Fall for an Angel's Kiss. Shadow Project had come to an end; however, a German tour for October had already been booked. Although all tickets, flyers and publicity for this tour were credited to Shadow Project, Williams had decided that the band name should change to Daucus Karota. He sang on the tour, Brian Butler was the guitarist, Mark Barone played bass and Christian Omar Madrigal Izzo was on drums. For one show, Demone drove from her home in Amsterdam to Germany to meet up with Williams backstage. The Shrine EP by Daucus Karota was recorded in January 1994 with Mark Barone (bass), Christian Omar Madrigal Izzo (drums) and Roxy (guitars). The EP was reviewed favourably by Trouser Press. Daucus Karota returned to Europe for a month-long European tour in November 1994, with Demone filling the support slot. The tour had Todd Dixon on drums, Michael Saavedra on bass and Brian Hansen on guitar. Hansen had replaced Rolf Donath, who had been the guitarist for the band at shows in Los Angeles and Mexico during that summer.

Later career 
Demone and Williams came together to release the album Dream Home Heartache in 1995. It was recorded by Williams and Demone in Gent, Belgium between March 28 and April 5, 1995, with help from Pieter Rekfelt. The producer was Ken Thomas who had previously worked with David Bowie on Hunky Dory. Williams and Gitane played a few shows together in April 1995 and again in December 1995. They toured the UK in April 1996.

In 1995, following his return from Europe, Williams joined up with Paris Sadonis and Ryan Wildstar to work on the spoken word album, The Whorse's Mouth. The lyrics, co-written with Ryan Wildstar, chronicle a period of heroin addiction from which the two eventually escaped. Shortly following the recording of The Whorse's Mouth, Williams began playing bass for EXP, the musical troupe created by Paris and Ryan Wildstar. He went on to play bass on their self-titled debut album with bandmates Paris (keyboards), Ryan Wildstar (vocals), Doriandra (vocals), Ace Farren Ford (horns/violin), Justin Bennett (drums) and Ignacio Segovia (percussion).

In 1997, Williams again paired up with Eva O to record the final Shadow Project album, From the Heart. He also recorded Wound of Exit, his last solo CD as Premature Ejaculation.

Other interests 
In addition to his musical activities, Williams had a keen interest in painting, along with collaging, and several of his pieces have been exhibited at some dark art shows through Los Angeles and Atlanta through his friend Snow Elizabeth. He also co-directed and scored Pig, a 1998 experimental psychological horror silent short film with underground film maker Nico B. The film stars Rozz Williams and James Hollan and was produced and directed by Nico B. Pig was the last work Williams did.

Personal life 
Williams did not like to discuss his sexual orientation publicly, and described his marriage with Eva O as more of a "partnership". In an interview with John Ellenberger of Golgotha Magazine in 1997, while discussing The Whorse's Mouth and how he was hesitant to have his family listen to the album, Williams stated, "There are certain things that I just feel don't need to be shared with them. It was really kind of a difficult thing for me to call and just say, you know, 'Well hey, guess what? I'm gay.' And my mother's response was, 'Well son, I'm not stupid.'"

Williams was raised in a strict Southern Baptist family, but abandoned this as he formed Christian Death. As the years went on, as he stated in an interview with Ellenberger, he eventually became a Satanist and practiced magic in the privacy of his home. However, in the mid-1990s, he stated in another interview with Ellenberger that he had developed a "close relationship with God."

And What About the Bells?, a collection of Williams' poetry compiled and edited by Ryan Wildstar, was released posthumously in 2010.

Suicide 
In the introduction for the book And What About the Bells?, Ryan Wildstar (born Ryan Gaumer), Williams' friend and roommate of eight years, stated that on March 31, the night before Williams took his own life, they watched the film Isadora (1968), about dancer Isadora Duncan, during which Wildstar retired to bed despite Williams' protest, who said, "You don't even know how it ends!" Wildstar replied that he knew Isadora hangs to death at the end after her scarf gets caught on the spokes of her car's wheel, and went to bed. Williams made final phone calls to friends and family that night. Wildstar said that if he had not been distraught over the death of his boyfriend Erik Christides, who died of a heroin overdose on November 27, 1997 (Thanksgiving Day), he would have seen the warning signs to Williams' suicide more clearly.

On April 1, 1998, Williams hanged himself in his West Hollywood apartment, at the age of 34. His body was discovered by Wildstar, who heard worried messages on the answering machine and broke down the door to Williams' bedroom when he returned home that afternoon. Williams had left a rose on the coffee table in the living room, along with several items, including The Hanged Man tarot card. He left no note. A memorial was held at the El Rey Theatre shortly after his death, and a small gathering of family and friends scattered his ashes at Runyon Canyon Park in the Hollywood Hills.

Theories have arisen regarding the reason for Williams's suicide, including failing health, depression, bipolar disorder, financial instability, and his fascination with the number 1334, which can be found in the liner notes of his albums, in his signature, and also on his urn. It is also unknown as to why Williams committed suicide on April Fools' Day. In the introduction for And What About the Bells?, Wildstar states that he views the details surrounding Williams' death as a form of art.

A memorial for Williams is located at the Hollywood Forever Cemetery. The cabinet in which he hanged himself as well as a few pieces of original artwork are on display at the LA Museum of Death.

Legacy 
Williams' creativity had a profound effect on the Goth subculture and was also influential in poetry and collage artwork. Annually, fans pay tribute to his life and work. In 2010, Gothic Beauty Magazine and a short film Necessary Discomforts an Artistic Tribute to Rozz Williams featured one such event at the Hyaena Gallery curated by A Raven Above Press.

The Mountain Goats' 2000 album, The Coroner's Gambit, was dedicated to Williams, and several songs refer to singer John Darnielle's reaction to Williams' death.

On April 1, 2018, to commemorate twenty years since Williams's death, Cult Epics and Dark Vinyl Records released two albums: In the Heart, recorded during the "Dream Home Heartache Tour", and On the Altar, from Williams's last European tour.

In 2018, Nico B. released a box set to commemorate the 20th anniversary of his film Pig, which starred Williams. Only twenty-five were made. Each included one of the few remaining VHS copies of the film (numbered up to 1334), an exclusive t-shirt, a postcard, lobby cards, a limited edition print of one of Williams' collages, a commemorative pin, and a portion of the original 8 mm film strip. Each box was signed and dated by Nico B., and each VHS tape was signed as well.

In 2022, Ryan Wildstar announced a new, updated English-language edition of And What About the Bells?. This new edition will include previously unreleased poems by Williams, scans of his handwritten works, a new, exclusive interview with Wildstar conducted by filmmaker, author, and poet Zach Shaw, and a new foreword, also by Shaw. It is slated for a 2023 release.

Discography, bands and solo act

Christian Death (1981–1985) 
 Deathwish (EP; recorded 1981/released 1984)
 Only Theatre of Pain (1982)
 Catastrophe Ballet (1984)
 Ashes (1985)
 The Decomposition of Violets (live; 1985)
 The Doll's Theatre: Live Oct. 31. 1981 (live; 1994)

Christian Death featuring Rozz Williams 
 The Iron Mask (1992)
 Skeleton Kiss EP (1992)
 Stick a Finger Down Its Throat (1992)
 The Path of Sorrows (1993)
 Iconologia (1993)
 Sleepless Nights: Live 1990 (1993)
 Invocations: 1981–1989 (1993)
 The Rage of Angels (1994)
 Tales of Innocence: A Continued Anthology (1994)
 Christian Death: Live (video; 1995)
 Death in Detroit (1995)
 Death Mix (1996)
 The Best of Christian Death (Featuring: Rozz Williams) (1999)
 Death Club (2005)
 Six Six Sixth Communion (2007)
 Death Box (box set; 2012)

Shadow Project (1987–1998) 
 Is Truth a Crime? (1989)
 Shadow Project (1991)
 Dreams for the Dying (1992)
 Dead Babies/Killer (1992)
 In Tuned Out – Live '93 (1994)
 From the Heart (1998)
 The Original Shadow Project (2005)

Premature Ejaculation (1981–1998) 
 PE – Pt.1 (1981)
 PE – Pt.2 (1981)
 A Little Hard to Swallow (1982)
 Living Monstrocities/Descent (1985)
 Death Cultures (1987)
 Assertive Discipline (1988)
 Death Cultures III (1988)
 Blood Told in Spine (1991)
 Death Cultures (1989)
 Anesthesia (1992)
 Necessary Discomforts (1993)
 Estimating the Time of Death (1994)
 Wound of Exit (1998)

Happiest Place on Earth (1986–1990) 
 Body of a Crow (1986)
 PULSE (1989)
 Environments: Birth, Death, Decay (1990)

Daucus Karota (1979, 1986, 1993–1994) 
 Shrine EP (1994)

Heltir (1987–1998) 
 Il banchetto dei cancri/VC-706 (1989)
 69 Rituals (1989)
 Neue sachlichkeit (1994)

EXP 
 EXP (1996)

Rozz Williams and Gitane Demone 
 Dream Home Heartache (1995)

Rozz Williams (1992–1998) 
 Every King a Bastard Son (1992)
 The Whorse's Mouth (1997)

Posthumous albums 
 Untitled (1999; available with "The Art of Rozz Williams")
 Live in Berlin (2000)
 Accept the Gift of Sin (2003)
  Sleeping Dogs (2013)
  In the Heart (2018)
  On the Altar (2018)

Filmography 
 Is Truth a Crime??? (1989)
 Pig (1998)
 1334 (2012; posthumous)

Bibliography 
 The Art of Rozz Williams: From Christian Death To Death (Softcover 1999) (Hardcover 2016, 2021)
 Le théâtre des douleurs... and What About The Bells? (2010)
 Christian Death - Only Theatre of Pain: Photography by Edward Colver (2022)

References

External links 
 Official website
 
 
 

1963 births
1998 suicides
20th-century American poets
20th-century American singers
American male poets
American male singer-songwriters
American punk rock singers
American rock songwriters
American rock singers
Bisexual men
Bisexual musicians
Burials at Hollywood Forever Cemetery
Christian Death members
Death rock musicians
Gothic rock musicians
LGBT people from California
American LGBT poets
Musicians from Los Angeles County, California
People from Pomona, California
Poets from California
Singer-songwriters from California
Suicides by hanging in California
American LGBT singers
American post-punk musicians
1998 deaths
20th-century American male singers
American bisexual writers